Oakland is a historic home located near Montpelier, Hanover County, Virginia. It was built in 1898–1846, and is a -story, three bay, frame farmhouse, with a -story, three bay by five bay, rambling wing.  It was built on the foundations of a house built in 1812 that was destroyed by fire. Also on the property are a contributing smokehouse and office. Oakland was the home and birthplace of the Virginia novelist, Thomas Nelson Page.

It was listed on the National Register of Historic Places in 1974.

References

Houses on the National Register of Historic Places in Virginia
Houses completed in 1898
Houses in Hanover County, Virginia
National Register of Historic Places in Hanover County, Virginia